In Etruscan religion and mythology, Tinia (also Tin, Tinh, Tins or Tina) was the god of the sky and the highest god in Etruscan mythology, equivalent to the Roman Jupiter and the Greek Zeus. However, a primary source from the Roman Varro states that Veltha, not Tins, was the supreme deity of the Etruscans. This has led some scholars to conclude that they were assimilated, but this is speculation. He was the husband of Uni and the father of Hercle. Like many other Etruscan deities, his name is gender neutral.

The Etruscans had a group of nine gods who had the power of hurling thunderbolts; they were called Novensiles by the Romans. Of thunderbolts there were eleven sorts, of which Tinia wielded three. 

Tinia was sometimes represented with a beard or sometimes as youthful and beardless. In terms of symbolism, Tinia has the thunderbolt. Tinia's thunderbolts could be red or blood coloured.

Like Selvans and possibly Laran, Tinia also protected boundaries. His name appears as the guarantor on three boundary stones with identical inscriptions found in Tunisia, originally placed there by the Etruscan colonists.

Some of Tinia's possible epithets are detailed on the Piacenza Liver, a bronze model of a liver used for haruspicy. These inscriptions have been transcribed as Tin Cilens, Tin Θuf and Tinś Θne. There have been a number of suggestions as to their meaning, but the Etruscan language is poorly understood and there is no scholarly consensus for the translation.

Inscriptions

Tinia appears in several inscriptions, including:
 Kylix painted by Oltos (c. 500 BC):

This has given Venel Atelinas for the sons of Tin (ie: The Dioscuri)
On the bronze Chimera of Arezzo:
Tinscvil
A gift to Tinia

See also
Etruscan religion 
Etruscan civilization  
Uni 
Hercle

References

Etruscan gods
Etruscan religion
Sky and weather gods
Thunder gods
Time and fate gods
Jovian deities